Blackwater Park is a 2001 album by Swedish progressive death metal band Opeth.

Blackwater Park may also refer to:
 the name of the gothic mansion in Wilkie Collins's The Woman in White
 Blackwater Park (band), German band
 "Blackwater Park", song by Opeth on Blackwater Park